The Izard County Courthouse is located at Courthouse Square and Arkansas Highway 69 in Melbourne, the county seat of Izard County, Arkansas.  It is a two-story structure, built of rusticated gray limestone, with modest Art Deco styling.  The grounds include a World War I memorial featuring a marble doughboy statue erected in 1930 in front of the courthouse. It was built in 1938–1940 by crews from the National Youth Administration.  It is the county's fourth courthouse, two of the first three having been destroyed by fire.

The building was listed on the National Register of Historic Places in 1993.

See also
National Register of Historic Places listings in Izard County, Arkansas

References

External links

Courthouses on the National Register of Historic Places in Arkansas
Art Deco architecture in Arkansas
Government buildings completed in 1938
Buildings and structures in Izard County, Arkansas
National Register of Historic Places in Izard County, Arkansas
Courthouses in Arkansas
National Youth Administration